Nosratabad-e Laklak (also Romanized as Noşratābād-e Laklak; also known as Noşratābād) is a village in Jolgeh Rural District, in the Central District of Asadabad County, Hamadan Province, Iran. At the 2006 census, its population was 372, in 82 families.

References 

Populated places in Asadabad County